The 214th Division was created in November 1949 under the Regulation of the Redesignations of All Organizations and Units of the Army, issued by Central Military Commission on November 1, 1948, basing on the 1st Division, 1st Corps, 1st Army Group of the People's Liberation Army of the Nationalist Party of China. Its history can be traced to the 197th Division, 100th Corps, 1st Army Group of Republic of China Army defected in August 1948.

The division is part of 52nd Corps. Under the flag of 214th division it took part in the Chinese Civil War.

On September 1951 the division was transferred to Army Group's control following 52nd Corp's disbandment. In March 1952 the division became a flood diversion project unit working against the flood on Ching River. In August 1952, after completion of the project, the division was disbanded and absorbed by the People's Volunteer Army.

References

中国人民解放军各步兵师沿革，http://blog.sina.com.cn/s/blog_a3f74a990101cp1q.html

Infantry divisions of the People's Liberation Army
Military units and formations established in 1949
Military units and formations disestablished in 1952